Migolska Gora is a small dispersed settlement in the hills in the Municipality of Mirna in southeastern Slovenia. The municipality is included in the Southeast Slovenia Statistical Region. The entire area is part of the traditional region of Lower Carniola.

References

External links
Migolska Gora on Geopedia

Populated places in the Municipality of Mirna